The case of Castañeda v. Pickard was tried in the United States District Court for the Southern District of Texas in 1978. This case was filed against the Raymondville Independent School District (RISD) in Texas by Roy Castañeda, the father of two Mexican-American children. Castañeda claimed that the RISD was discriminating against his children because of their ethnicity. He argued that the classroom his children were being taught in was segregated, using a grouping system for classrooms based on criteria that were both ethnically and racially discriminating.

Castañeda also claimed the Raymondville Independent School District failed to establish sufficient bilingual education programs, which would have aided his children in overcoming the language barriers that prevented them from participating equally in the classroom.

According to Lau v. Nichols, 414 U.S. 563 (1974), a case decided by the U.S. Supreme Court, school districts in this country are required to take the necessary actions in order to provide students who do not speak English as their first language the ability to overcome the educational barriers associated with not being able to properly comprehend what is being taught to them.  Castañeda argued that there was no way to sufficiently measure the Raymondville Independent School District's approach to overcoming this barrier.

The Castañeda v. Pickard case was tried, and on August 17, 1978, the court system ultimately ruled in favor of the Raymondville Independent School District, stating they had not violated any of the Castañeda children's constitutional or statutory rights.  As a result of the District Court ruling, Castañeda filed for an appeal, arguing that the District Court made a mistake in its ruling.

In 1981 the United States Court of Appeals for the Fifth Circuit ruled in favor of the Castañedas, and as a result, the court decision established a three-part assessment for determining how bilingual education programs would be held responsible for meeting the requirements of the Equal Educational Opportunities Act of 1974. The criteria are listed below:

The bilingual education program must be “based on sound educational theory.”
The program must be “implemented effectively with resources for personnel, instructional materials, and space.”
After a trial period, the program must be proven effective in overcoming language barriers/handicaps.

References

Bibliography
Mora, Jill Kerper, "Legal History of Bilingual Education." San Diego State University. 26 January 2005.  San Diego State University. 12 February 2007. <https://web.archive.org/web/20070203130033/http://coe.sdsu.edu/people/jmora/Pages/HistoryBE.htm>.
Larsen, Ann. "Office of Educational Services and Support." South Dakota Department of Education. 2004.  SD Dept. of Education. 12 February 2007. <https://web.archive.org/web/20070212003908/http://doe.sd.gov/oess/title/IIIela/rationale.asp>.
Hakuta, Kenji, "Castañeda vs. Pickard (1981) " LAU - A resource for students, teachers, researchers, and policymakers. Stanford University School of Education. 12 February 2007. #
Temple, Charles et al. (2005). “Bilingual Education.” All Children Read: Teaching for Literacy in Today’s Diverse Classrooms. Pearson/Merrill/Prentice Hall Publishers. Page 54.

External links
Graph of the Castañeda Model

Bilingual education
United States Court of Appeals for the Fifth Circuit cases
United States education case law
Mexican-American history
1981 in United States case law
Language case law
1981 in education
1981 in Texas
Education in Willacy County, Texas